PowerPoint is a presentation software program by Microsoft Corporation.

PowerPoint, Power Point, or Powerpoint may also refer to the following:

 Slide shows in general
 AC power plugs and sockets
 Power Points, in the Pokémon series of cards and video games
 Magic point, in role playing games
 PowerPoint Ministries, the radio and television ministry of Prestonwood Baptist Church and Senior Pastor Jack Graham

See also
 PPTS (disambiguation)
 PPT (disambiguation)